In mathematical logic, Rosser's trick is a method for proving Gödel's incompleteness theorems without the assumption that the theory being considered is ω-consistent (Smorynski 1977, p. 840; Mendelson 1977, p. 160). This method was introduced by  J. Barkley Rosser in 1936, as an improvement of Gödel's original proof of the incompleteness theorems that was published in 1931.

While Gödel's original proof uses a sentence that says (informally) "This sentence is not provable", Rosser's trick uses a formula that says "If this sentence is provable, there is a shorter proof of its negation".

Background 

Rosser's trick begins with the assumptions of Gödel's incompleteness theorem. A theory  is selected which is effective, consistent, and includes a sufficient fragment of elementary arithmetic.

The assumptions on  also show that it is able to define a negation function , with the property that if  is a code for a formula  then  is a code for the formula . The negation function may take any value whatsoever for inputs that are not codes of formulas.

The Gödel sentence of the theory  is a formula , sometimes denoted , such that  proves  ↔. Gödel's proof shows that if  is consistent then it cannot prove its Gödel sentence; but in order to show that the negation of the Gödel sentence is also not provable, it is necessary to add a stronger assumption that the theory is ω-consistent, not merely consistent. For example, the theory , in which PA is Peano axioms, proves . Rosser (1936) constructed a different self-referential sentence that can be used to replace the Gödel sentence in Gödel's proof, removing the need to assume ω-consistency.

The Rosser sentence 
For a fixed arithmetical theory , let  and  be the associated proof predicate and negation function.

A modified proof predicate  is defined as:

which means that

This modified proof predicate is used to define a modified provability predicate :

An immediate consequence of the definition is that if  includes enough arithmetic, then it can prove that for every formula ,  implies . (In fact  only needs to prove that such a situation cannot hold for any two numbers, as well as to include some first-order logic)

Using the diagonal lemma, let  be a formula such that  proves ρ ↔ ¬ Pvbl(#ρ).  ↔. The formula  is the Rosser sentence of the theory

Rosser's theorem 
Let  be an effective, consistent theory including a sufficient amount of arithmetic, with Rosser sentence . Then the following hold (Mendelson 1977, p. 160):
  does not prove 
  does not prove 

In order to prove this, one first shows that for a formula  and a number , if  holds, then  proves . This is shown in a similar manner to what is done in Gödel's proof of the first incompleteness theorem:  proves , a relation between two concrete natural numbers; one then goes over all the natural numbers  smaller than  one by one, and for each ,  proves , again, a relation between two concrete numbers. 

The assumption that  includes enough arithmetic (in fact, what is required is basic first-order logic) ensures that  also proves  in that case.

Therefore  holds, and thus  proves .

The proof of (1) is similar to that in Gödel's proof of the first incompleteness theorem: Assume  proves ; then it follows, by the previous elaboration, that  proves . Thus  also proves . But we assumed  proves , and this is impossible if  is consistent. We are forced to conclude that  does not prove .

Assume  proves ; then it follows, by the previous elaboration, that  proves . But by the immediate consequence of the definition of Rosser's provability predicate, mentioned in the previous section, it follows that  proves . Thus  also proves . But we assumed  proves , and this is impossible if  is consistent. We are forced to conclude that  does not prove .

References 
 Mendelson (1977), Introduction to Mathematical Logic
 Smorynski (1977), "The incompleteness theorems", in Handbook of Mathematical Logic, Jon Barwise, Ed., North Holland, 1982,

External links 
 Avigad (2007), "Computability and Incompleteness", lecture notes.

Mathematical logic